Anita Kaplan Bahn (1920 – July 19, 1980) was an American epidemiologist, biostatistician, and cancer researcher.

Education and career
Bahn was originally from New York City. She left high school at the age of 15, and earned a bachelor's degree in biology four years later from Hunter College, together with a certification allowing her to teach high school biology. She would also go on to study "physics at New York City College; botany and bacteriology at Cornell University; mathematics and statistics at American University and at George Washington University", but without completing those programs to a graduate degree.

She became head of outpatient studies at the National Institute of Mental Health from 1951 to 1966. During this time,  she earned a Sc.D. from Johns Hopkins University in 1960. Her dissertation, supervised by Jerome Cornfield, was A Methodological Study of the Outpatient Psychiatric Clinic Population of Maryland, 1948-59.
She then returned to academia as an associate professor of biostatistics at the Medical College of Pennsylvania. While there, she worked towards an M.D., which she earned in 1972.

She became chief epidemiologist of Maryland for the following two years, and then became a professor of community medicine and epidemiology at the School of Medicine at the University of Pennsylvania.
At Pennsylvania, she helped found a graduate program in epidemiology, and led a research center on the epidemiology of cancer. She was also affiliated with the Fox Chase Cancer Center and held an adjunct position at Temple University.
In 1980, she was recruited to head a new epidemiology program in the Graduate School of Public Health at San Diego State University,
but she died of a cerebral hemorrhage at the hospital of the University of Pennsylvania before she could take up her new position.

Books
Bahn is the author of Basic Medical Statistics (Grune & Stratton, 1972).
With Judith S. Mausner, she wrote
Epidemiology: An Introductory Text (Saunders, 1974).

Awards and honors
Bahn was named a Fellow of the American Statistical Association in 1970. She was also a fellow of the American Public Health Association and the American College of Preventive Medicine.

Personal
Her husband, Ralph Bahn, died in the early 1970s; she married again to nuclear physicist and science fiction fan Milton A. Rothman, who survived her.

References

1920 births
1980 deaths
American women epidemiologists
American epidemiologists
American statisticians
Women statisticians
Biostatisticians
Hunter College alumni
Johns Hopkins University alumni
Perelman School of Medicine at the University of Pennsylvania faculty
Fellows of the American Statistical Association
Date of birth missing